Elise (Sara) Henle Levi (10 August 1832, Munich – 18 August 1892, Frankfurt am Main) was a German Jewish writer, dramatist, and poet. She was the author of numerous dramatic comedies, opera libretti, poems, and cookbooks.

Biography
Elise Henle was born in Munich, Bavaria into a wealthy Jewish court factor family, the fifth of six children of Therese and Benedict (Baruch) Henle. Her father had made a name for himself as the author of geographical and horological reference books. He was the son of activist  and grandson of Rabbi , and her mother the sister of poet Henriette Ottenheimer. Her brother  would become a prominent politician and lawyer of the Bavarian royal family. She was educated at the Aschersche Mädcheninstitut boarding school in Munich.

After her marriage in July 1853 to jewellery manufacturer Leopold Levi, Henle settled in Esslingen, Württemberg, where her house became the rendezvous of a distinguished society circle. Later, when her husband's company went bankrupt in 1881, she moved to Munich to live with her daughter. In 1889 she relocated to her widowed sister's home in Frankfurt am Main, where she died three years later. She was buried in the Frankfurt Jewish Cemetery in a funeral officiated by Rabbi Rudolf Reuben Plaut.

Work
Elise Henle's first literary publication was the satirical poem Hut ab!, written in 1867 in response to an anti-Semitic statement by a judicial officer. it was followed by the sketch Beim Volkfest (1869), the novella Das Zweite Jägerbataillon (1869), and the narrative Die Wacht am Rhein (1870).

She entered the dramatic field successfully with the political comedy Der Zweite September, which was soon followed by the drama Percy (a free adaptation of Philipp Galen) and the libretto of 's romantic-comic opera Manon, oder Schloß de l'Orme, based on Abbé Prévost's Histoire du Chevalier des Grieux et de Manon Lescaut. Her comedies Durch die Intendanz, Die Wiener in Stuttgart, Aus Göthes lustigen Tagen, Der Erbonkel, and Liebesqualen met with marked success in several German and Austrian theatres. The latter was performed at the Stadttheater in Altona on 27 November 1881.

Near the end of her life, Henle published two popular Swabian German cookbooks in verse, Guat is's (1888) and So mag i's (1892, reprinted 1988).

Partial bibliography

 
 
 
 
 
 
  Music by Richard Kleinmichel.
 
 
 
  Music by Ferdinand Langer.

References
 

1830 births
1892 deaths
19th-century German dramatists and playwrights
19th-century German poets
19th-century Jews
German opera librettists
German salon-holders
Jewish dramatists and playwrights
Jewish German writers
Jewish women writers
People from Esslingen am Neckar
Women cookbook writers
Women opera librettists
Writers from Munich